Parag is a Sanskrit word, meaning pollen. It may refer to:

People
Parag Agrawal, Indian-American software engineer, former CEO of Twitter
Parag Madkaikar, Indian cricketer
Parag More, Indian cricketer
Parag Khanna, Indian-American specialist in geopolitics and globalization
Parag Kumar Das (1961–1996), Indian journalist, newspaper editor and political activist
Umesh Parag (born 1971), New Zealand field hockey player
Riyan Parag, Indian cricketer

Other uses
Parag, Croatia, village in  northern Croatia

Parag (magazine), a children's magazine published by The Times Group in the 1980s and 1990s

Hindu given names